William Larned defeated Robert LeRoy 6–2, 6–2, 6–4 in the all comers' final to win the men's singles tennis title at the 1907 U.S. National Championships. Defending champion William Clothier was unable to defend his title in the Challenge Round due to an injury in his right leg. The event was held at the Newport Casino in Newport, R.I. in the United States.

Draw

Challenge round

All Comers' finals

Earlier rounds

Section 1

Section 2

Section 3

Section 4

Section 5

Section 6

Section 7

Section 8

References
 

Men's Singles
1907